This is a list of launches performed by Ariane carrier rockets between 1979, when the type first flew, and 1989. This period includes all flights of the Ariane 1, Ariane 2 and Ariane 3, as well as early Ariane 4 launches.

Launch statistics

Rocket configurations

Launch outcomes

Launch history

References